The Xiaomi Mi A2 (also known as Xiaomi Mi 6X) is a mid-range smartphone co-developed by Xiaomi and Google as part of Android One program.

Specifications

Hardware

The phone features a 5.99 inches Full HD+ IPS LCD display with 1080 x 2160 pixels and 403 ppi pixel density, unimetal body and Corning Gorilla Glass 5 protection. It is powered by Qualcomm Snapdragon 660 SoC with Adreno 512 GPU.and has a 2.0, Type-C 1.0 reversible connector. It has a dual rear camera setup with 12 MP Sony IMX486 primary camera (1.25 μm pixel size and f/1.75 aperture) and 20 MP Sony IMX376 secondary camera (2.0 μm pixel size and f/1.75 aperture). The front camera is 20 MP Sony IMX376 sensor with 2.0 μm pixel size with f/2.2 aperture. It has a 3010 mAh battery which supports Qualcomm Quick Charge 3.0 (4.0 for India).

This is the first mid-range Xiaomi smartphone to remove the 3.5 mm audio jack and microSD slot.

Software

The Xiaomi Mi A2 is part of the Android One program where software updates are provided directly from Google. The Mi 6X variant runs on Xiaomi's MIUI.

It is preinstalled with Android 8.1.0 "Oreo" out of the box, and can be upgraded to Android 10. Unofficially, the operating system can be replaced with Ubuntu Touch.

Being a part of Android One program, Mi A2 provides a Stock Android experience and UI which is very close to those of Google Pixel UI.

Release

The Xiaomi Mi A2 is a re-branded Xiaomi Mi 6X phone. The Xiaomi Mi 6X was first released in April 2018, while the A2 was released in July 2018. A stripped-down version of the phone was released on the same month known as Xiaomi Mi A2 Lite.

The Mi A2 Lite, however, did include 3.5 mm audio jack, microSD slot and a higher battery capacity (4000 mAh). Unlike the regular Mi A2, the Mi A2 Lite is based on Xiaomi's budget Redmi series. A variant of this phone is known as Redmi 6 Pro, which shares the same hardware specification, but runs on MIUI user interface instead of Android One.

References

Android (operating system) devices
Xiaomi smartphones
Mobile phones introduced in 2018
Mobile phones with multiple rear cameras
Mobile phones with 4K video recording
Mobile phones with infrared transmitter
Discontinued smartphones
Ubuntu Touch devices